If You Are the One is a 2008 Chinese romantic comedy drama film written and directed by Feng Xiaogang and starring Ge You and Shu Qi.  The film has been very successful at the Chinese box office, and has become one of Feng's top grossing films to date, earning over ¥364 million (US$53.7 million) at the box office.

Cast 
Ge You
Shu Qi
Alex Fong Chung-Sun
Vivian Hsu
Fan Wei
Feng Yuanzheng
Hu Ke
Gong Xinliang
Luo Haiqiong

Plot
Qin Fen (Ge), in his late forties, returns to China after many years overseas. He did not earn any degree while he was overseas but he is good at convincing others. After selling an "innovative invention" to a high-profile (but foolish) angel investor (Fan), Qin becomes a multimillionaire and with his new fortune, he decides to put an end to his bachelor life, advertising online for potential marriage partners, to apply "if you are the one", that is, only if they are sincere.

He encounters various candidates, from a homosexual former workmate, a cemetery saleswoman with a thick southern-Chinese accent, a pathological amnesiac, an ethnic minority pecking hen, an asexual widow, an expectant single mother (Hsu), and a stock-holding trader. Eventually, he crosses paths with air stewardess Liang Xiaoxiao (Shu), who previously had a painful love affair with a married man (Fong). Qin strikes up an unexpected friendship with Liang, and they start dating, under the agreement that Liang's heart will always be with her previous lover. Qin sets out to woo her completely, and their business-like arrangement eventually blossoms into love during a trip to Hokkaido.

Production 

If You Are the One was filmed in locations throughout Beijing and Hangzhou in China, and Hokkaido in Japan from August, 2008 to October, 2008.

Critical reception 
The film was a box office hit in the mainland and received largely positive reviews.

Variety states: "After taking a left turn into big-budgeters The Banquet and Assembly, Feng Xiaogang returns to the kind of film that made his name -- ironic observational comedies," and described the film as a "beautifully observed relationship movie is overly discursive in its second half but always watchable, thanks to terrific chemistry between Feng regular Ge You and Taiwanese actress Shu Qi."

The Hollywood Reporter states: "Feng Xiaogang makes an assured return to his trademark genre, the romantic comedy. If You Are the One, a diverting urban lark about an unlikely couple coming together through blind dates, sports an affable cast and untaxing plot, harking back to the airy playfulness of his 1998 hit Be There or Be Square."

Perry Lam of Muse Magazine praised 'the unreserved energy Feng devotes to delivering us the predictable, coupled with the unembarrassed pleasure we take in enjoying the obvious. You can still make a movie with a formula, it would appear, so long as you bring the formula to vivid life.'

Notes

External links 

2008 films
2008 romantic comedy films
2000s Mandarin-language films
Films directed by Feng Xiaogang
Chinese romantic comedy films
Films set in Hokkaido
Huayi Brothers films